Clément Barbot (1914 14 July 1963) was a top aide to Haitian President François Duvalier. Following a 1958 coup attempt, Barbot became the first leader of the Tonton Macoute, a 'National Security Volunteer Militia' that brutally enforced Duvalier's despotic rule. After suffering a heart attack in May 1959, Duvalier named Barbot as his proxy; once he recovered he accused Barbot of trying to usurp him as President, and had him imprisoned at the notorious Fort Dimanche. After he was released in 1963, Barbot, his brother Harry, and a small group of supporters attempted to overthrow Duvalier by kidnapping his children in Port-au-Prince. The effort quickly collapsed, and over the next few days Barbot and his men were chased down and killed.

References

1914 births
1963 deaths
Assassinated Haitian people
People murdered in Haiti